Sæbyggjenuten is a mountain on the border of Agder and Vestfold og Telemark counties in southern Norway. The mountain sits on the border of the municipalities of Bykle (in Agder county) and Tokke (in Vestfold og Telemark county).

See also
 List of highest points of Norwegian counties
List of mountains of Norway

References

Mountains of Agder
Mountains of Vestfold og Telemark
Highest points of Norwegian counties
Bykle
Tokke